Mount Carmel Cemetery is a Jewish cemetery in the Wissinoming neighborhood of Philadelphia, Pennsylvania.  It was established in the mid-1800s.  The earliest recorded burial at Mount Carmel Cemetery was in 1832.  The cemetery was mainly a burial site for Jewish immigrants from Russia.

The management of the cemetery was taken over by nearby Har Nebo Cemetery.

Desecration 
The cemetery was desecrated in October 1982 by semi-literate vandals who knocked about 100 headstones over, left empty beer bottles, and marked a headstone with two swastikas and "Hile Hitler"(sic).

The cemetery was desecrated again by vandals in February 2017 who knocked over 250 plus headstones. The repairs from 2017 were never completed. As of July 2020, the cemetery lies a state of extreme disrepair and neglect.

References

External links
Mount Carmel Cemetery at Find a Grave

Cemeteries in Philadelphia
Jewish cemeteries in Pennsylvania
Cemetery vandalism and desecration
21st-century attacks on synagogues and Jewish communal organizations in the United States
Russian-American culture in Pennsylvania
Russian-Jewish culture in the United States